In Polynesian mythology, Matuu or Matu is the god of the north wind and the second wind to be controlled by Maui.

References

Polynesian gods
Wind deities